St. Brides Correctional Center is a state prison occupying  in the city of Chesapeake, Virginia, first opened in 1973 and re-built in 2007.

The facility is a medium-security prison for men, owned and operated by the Virginia Department of Corrections. It lies in a rural section of the city, south-southeast of downtown Chesapeake, adjacent to another state prison, the Indian Creek Correctional Center.  Its current warden is Dara Watson.

References 

Prisons in Virginia
Buildings and structures in Chesapeake, Virginia
1973 establishments in Virginia